The Great Basin Floristic Province is a floristic province of the Madrean Subkingdom (floristic region), in the Boreal Kingdom (floristic kingdom). It is located in the Western United States.

A floristic province (otherwise known as a phytochorion) is a concept defined by Ronald Good, in 1947, and refined by Armen Takhtajan, in 1986. A phytochorion is a region on earth that has a relative constant composition of plants. Takhtajan defined the Great Basin Floristic Province to extend well beyond the boundaries of the hydrographically defined Great Basin: it includes the Snake River Plain, the Colorado Plateau, the Uinta Basin, and parts of Arizona north of the Mogollon Rim. The Great Basin phytochorion is distinguished by the presence of Great Basin sagebrush (Artemisia tridentata), and saltbushes in genus Atriplex.

The Great Basin floristic province is one geographical division scheme for the Intermountain West, amongst many. Other classifications are proposed by the U.S. Environmental Protection Agency (i.e., the Central Basin and Range ecoregion and the Northern Basin and Range ecoregion), and by the World Wildlife Fund (i.e., Great Basin shrub steppe and Great Basin montane forests)

The larger deserts of the Great Basin Province are: the Great Basin Desert ( in Nevada; and the Great Salt Lake Desert ( and Escalante Desert ( in Utah.

References

Floristic provinces
 
Floristic
Ecoregions of the United States
Plant communities of the Western United States
Madrean Region